The 1969 Masters Tournament was the 33rd Masters Tournament, held April 10–13 at Augusta National Golf Club in Augusta, Georgia.

George Archer won his only major championship, one stroke ahead of runners-up Billy Casper, George Knudson, and Tom Weiskopf. Third round leader Casper was five over-par after ten holes in his final round, then regrouped with three birdies but needed another. Weiskopf was tied for the lead until a bogey at 17, and future champion Charles Coody bogeyed the final three holes and finished two strokes back. Casper would win the title in 1970 in a playoff and Coody would win in 1971.

This was the last Masters that Ken Venturi participated in, and he missed the cut by twelve strokes. As an amateur in 1956, Venturi led after 54 holes but finished runner-up to Jack Burke Jr. Burke made the cut at the Masters for the final time in 1969 and finished in 24th place. Past champions were noticeably absent from the leaderboard this year, as Burke tied for the best finish with three-time winner Jack Nicklaus.

It was Archer's third Masters and his only top ten finish at Augusta; his next best result was tied for eleventh in 1981.

Bob Lunn won the tenth Par 3 contest on Wednesday with a score of 23.

Course

^ Holes 1, 2, 4, and 11 were later renamed.

Field
1. Masters champions
Gay Brewer (9,11), Jack Burke Jr., Doug Ford, Bob Goalby (8,10), Ralph Guldahl, Claude Harmon, Herman Keiser, Cary Middlecoff, Jack Nicklaus (2,3,8,9), Arnold Palmer (10,11), Henry Picard, Gary Player (2,3,8,9), Gene Sarazen, Sam Snead (9), Art Wall Jr. (8)
Jimmy Demaret, Ben Hogan, and Byron Nelson did not play.

The following categories only apply to Americans

2. U.S. Open champions (last five years)
Billy Casper (8,9,10,11), Lee Trevino (9), Ken Venturi

3. The Open champions (last five years)

4. PGA champions (last five years)
Julius Boros (8,9,10,11), Al Geiberger (9,10,11), Don January (8), Dave Marr (8), Bobby Nichols (9,11)

5. The first eight finishers in the 1968 U.S. Amateur
Bob Barbarossa (a), John Bohmann (a), Bruce Fleisher (6,7,a), Vinny Giles (7,8,a), Hubert Green (a), Jack Lewis Jr. (7,a), Rik Massengale (a), Allen Miller (a)

Miller and Billy Joe Patton tied for 8th place but Miller won the place by the drawing of lots. Canadian Gary Cowan also tied for 8th place but was not eligible.

6. Previous two U.S. Amateur and Amateur champions

Bob Dickson forfeited his exemption by turning professional.

7. Members of the 1968 U.S. Eisenhower Trophy team
Dick Siderowf (a)

8. Top 24 players and ties from the 1968 Masters Tournament
Tommy Aaron, George Archer (9,10), Miller Barber (10), Frank Beard (10), Gardner Dickinson (11), Raymond Floyd, Lionel Hebert, Jerry Pittman (9), Mason Rudolph, Doug Sanders (10,11), Tom Weiskopf, Bert Yancey (9), Kermit Zarley (10)

9. Top 16 players and ties from the 1968 U.S. Open
Don Bies, Rod Funseth, Dave Hill, Steve Spray, Dave Stockton

10. Top eight players and ties from 1968 PGA Championship
Frank Boynton, Charles Coody, Marty Fleckman, Lou Graham, Dan Sikes

11. Members of the U.S. 1967 Ryder Cup team
Gene Littler, Johnny Pott

12. One player, either amateur or professional, not already qualified, selected by a ballot of ex-Masters champions.
Bob Murphy

13. Leading six players, not already qualified, from a points list based on finishes in PGA Tour events since the previous Masters
Deane Beman, Dale Douglass, Bob Lunn, Mac McLendon, R. H. Sikes, Ken Still

14. Foreign invitations
Roberto Bernardini, Michael Bonallack (6,a), Peter Butler, Joe Carr (a), Bob Charles (8,9,10), Bruce Crampton, Roberto De Vicenzo (3,8), Bruce Devlin (8,9), Harold Henning (8), Tommy Horton, Brian Huggett, Tony Jacklin (8), George Knudson, Takaaki Kono, Lu Liang-Huan, Ramón Sota, Peter Thomson (3), Peter Townsend, Raul Travieso

Numbers in brackets indicate categories that the player would have qualified under had they been American.

Round summaries

First round
Thursday, April 10, 1969

Source:

Second round
Friday, April 11, 1969

Source:

Third round
Saturday, April 12, 1969

Despite being 2-over-par for his round Bruce Devlin was still in the thick of the chase at 5-under on Saturday until the Par-3 16th Hole where he rinsed his tee shot leading to a double-bogey 5 and leaving him five strokes behind starting the Final Round (where he further faded with a front nine of 6-over par 42 leading to a tie for 19th).  Earlier in the round Devlin had made a great scrambling bogey at the difficult Par-4 11th after finding the water on his second shot, but could not repeat the magic when he found the water at 16.  

Source:

Final round
Sunday, April 13, 1969

Summary
Billy Casper started the final round at 8-under par with a one-stroke lead over George Archer, but Casper bogeyed five of the first 10 holes. Meanwhile, Archer gained a three-stroke lead at 8-under after 9 holes over George Knudson, Charles Coody and Tom Weiskopf (who was playing with Archer). As the back nine unfolded there was a lot of movement on the leaderboard and standing on the 18th tee, five of the last 6 players on the course had a chance to win the tournament outright or force a Monday playoff. Only Miller Barber, playing with Casper in the final group, was out of contention for the title. The final three groups ended up on the 18th hole at the same time: Casper (−6) and Barber (-3) waiting on the tee with Archer (−7) and Weiskopf (−6) looking on from the fairway while Coody (−6) was left of the green needing to chip in for a birdie to tie and Knudson (−6) on the green some 26 feet away also needing a tying birdie.

Final leaderboard

Sources:

Scorecard

Cumulative tournament scores, relative to par

References

External links
Masters.com – past winners and results
Augusta.com – 1969 Masters leaderboard and scorecards

1969
1969 in golf
1969 in American sports
1969 in sports in Georgia (U.S. state)
April 1969 sports events in the United States